Roaring Westward is a 1949 American Western film directed by Oliver Drake and written by Ronald Davidson. The film stars Jimmy Wakely, Dub Taylor, Dennis Moore, Lois Hall, Jack Ingram and Claire Whitney. The film was released on September 15, 1949, by Monogram Pictures.

Plot

Cast          
Jimmy Wakely as Jimmy Wakely
Dub Taylor as Cannonball
Dennis Moore as Sanders
Lois Hall as Susan Braden
Jack Ingram as Marshal Bill Braden
Claire Whitney as Aunt Jessica Martin
Marshall Reed as Matthews
Kenne Duncan as Morgan
Mike Ragan as Bart 
Buddy Swan as Perry Andrews
Nolan Leary as Mossy Stevens 
Bud Osborne as Deputy Lafe Blake

References

External links
 

1949 films
American Western (genre) films
1949 Western (genre) films
Monogram Pictures films
Films directed by Oliver Drake
American black-and-white films
1940s English-language films
1940s American films